Andrew Lee may refer to:

 Andrew Lee (Australian footballer) (born 1986), player in the Australian Football League
 Andrew E. Lee (1847–1934), third Governor of South Dakota
 Andrew Daulton Lee (born 1952), American drug dealer and espionage agent
 W. P. Andrew Lee (born  1957), Taiwanese-American surgeon
 Louis Auchincloss (1917–2010), American novelist and lawyer, who wrote as Andrew Lee
 Andrew Lee (entrepreneur) (born 1983), Korean-American internet entrepreneur
 Andrew Lee (magician) (born 1986), Malaysian magician
 R. Andrew Lee (born 1982), American pianist

See also 
 Andy Lee (disambiguation)
 Andrew Li (born 1948), former Chief Justice of the Court of Final Appeal of Hong Kong
 Andrew Leigh (born 1972), Australian politician and economist
 Andrew Lees (disambiguation)